Roman Catholic Diocese of Villarrica may refer to:

 Roman Catholic Diocese of Villarrica in Chile
 Roman Catholic Diocese of Villarrica del Espíritu Santo in Paraguay